Rhodothamniella floridula is a small red seaweed detectable more easily with the feet than with the eyes. It thrives only where sand and rock occur together: anchored to the rock, it accumulates sand to form a slightly soft irregular carpet a centimetre or so in thickness. Although the surface is a dull red colour, in cross section the appearance is of a miniature sand dune with no visible algal component. Unable to stand significant desiccation, it prefers locations from the mid-shore downwards.

It is to be found on most suitable shorelines around Britain and northern Europe.

References

Red algae genera
Florideophyceae
Monotypic algae genera